Renata Pisu (born Rome, 4 September 1935) is an Italian writer. She was the recipient of the Rapallo Carige Prize for La via della Cina in 2000.

References

Italian women novelists
20th-century Italian women writers
20th-century Italian novelists
21st-century Italian women writers
21st-century Italian novelists
Writers from Rome
1935 births
Living people